Minister of National Defence for Naval Services (Canada) was the minister responsible for the Royal Canadian Navy during World War II. The post was merged into the current post of the Minister of National Defence (Canada)

List of Ministers of National Defence for Naval Services:

Minister of Naval Services
Prior to World War II, another ministerial post, Minister of the Naval Service existed from the creation of the Royal Canadian Navy in 1910 up to 1922 and preceded the Minister of National Defence.

Ministers with military experience

Macdonald served as a Lieutenant overseas with the 25th Battalion (Nova Scotia Rifles), CEF.

Abbott served overseas (at Vimy Ridge as Gunner) with the 7th (McGill) Siege Battery, Canadian Garrison Artillery, Royal Regiment of Canadian Artillery (1916-1918) and with the RAF briefly in 1918.

See also

 Minister of Militia and Defence
 Minister of the Naval Service
 Minister of National Defence
 Minister of Aviation
 Minister of National Defence for Air
 Minister of Overseas Military Forces

References

Navy of Canada
National Defence